Wilfrid Walter Timms (28 September 1902 – 30 September 1986) was an English cricketer and schoolteacher who played first-class cricket for Northamptonshire and Cambridge University from 1921 to 1932. 

Timms made his first-class debut while still a schoolboy at Northampton School for Boys. In his second match, when Northamptonshire followed on 381 in arrears, he scored 154 not out in five and three-quarter hours to save the match. 

From 1930 he taught as a schoolmaster at Charterhouse School in Godalming, running the cricket at the school from 1932 to 1946.

References

External links
 
 Wilfrid Timms at CricketArchive

1902 births
1986 deaths
People educated at Northampton School for Boys
English cricketers
Cambridge University cricketers
Northamptonshire cricketers
Cricketers from Northampton